Danao may refer to:

Places
 Danao, Bohol, Philippines
 Danao, Cebu, Philippines
 Danao, a barangay in Pototan, Iloilo, Philippines
 Danao, a barangay in Janiuay, Iloilo, Philippines
 Danao-Danao Island, Iloilo

People
 Bimbo Danao (1915 – 1967), Filipino actor
 Johnoy Danao, Filipino independent musician, composer, and singer-songwriter
 Kiwi Alejandro Danao Camara (b. 1984), Filipino-American attorney
 Pilar Manalo Danao (1914 - 1987)

Other uses
 Danao languages
 Lake Danao (disambiguation)

See also
 Danau (disambiguation)
 Danou (disambiguation)
 Lake Danao (disambiguation)
 Davao (disambiguation)